Dorado Software is a multinational information technology company specializing in the development, licensing, and support of network management software. Dorado develops and maintains the Cruz product suite (formerly Redcell), which provides infrastructure and service lifecycle management for heterogeneous and multi-technology environments.

Cruz
Dorado's Cruz product suite (formerly branded as Redcell) combines a range of management functions in a single console and also automates the deployment and management of network devices including routers, switches, PCs, servers, storage and security appliances.  Cruz product features include automated configuration, change management, monitoring the health and performance of assets, trend reporting, network traffic analysis, service provisioning, and managed service provider features.

Dorado has an OEM relationship with other companies such as Dell EMC and CommTelNS that private-label or embed its technology.  Notably, Cruz serves as the basis for Open Manage Network Manager which is sold by Dell EMC as a means of managing their various lines of switches and/or network equipment from other vendors such as Cisco Systems, Juniper Networks, etc.

History 
Dorado was founded in 1998 in El Dorado Hills, California as a provider of application development environments for OEM element management systems (EMS). The company used this experience to build a multi-vendor management system that evolved into the suite of Cruz products.

See also 
 Communications service provider
 Infrastructure management services

References

Further reading

External links 
 

Telecommunications companies of the United States
Telephony software
Software companies based in California
Software companies of the United States